Butchie's Drive-In, now known as Bailey's Dairy Treat, is a historic restaurant at 534 Park Avenue in Hot Springs, Arkansas.  It is a small single-story Art Moderne structure, with sleek rounded lines, neon lighting, and a stucco finish.  There are two service windows at the front, and the interior has retained much of its original form, even though the kitchen equipment has been upgraded.  The floor is largely original quarry tile, and the bathroom has original fixtures.  Built in 1952, this is one of the few establishments of this type to survive, of a number that once lined Park Avenue.

The building was listed on the National Register of Historic Places in 2004.

See also
National Register of Historic Places listings in Garland County, Arkansas

References

Buildings and structures in Hot Springs, Arkansas
Restaurants in Arkansas
Commercial buildings on the National Register of Historic Places in Arkansas
Restaurants established in 1952
National Register of Historic Places in Hot Springs, Arkansas
Restaurants on the National Register of Historic Places
1952 establishments in Arkansas
Streamline Moderne architecture in Arkansas